The Greenspun Media Group is an independent company and was a wholly owned subsidiary of The Greenspun Corporation. Headquartered in Henderson, Nevada, the group has over 60 years experience in the Las Vegas Valley. Beginning with the Las Vegas Sun newspaper in 1950, the company has grown to more than 30 publications and a total distribution exceeding 27 million magazines and newspapers. In 2007, The Greenspun Group acquired Niche Media, which was founded in 1992 by Jason Binn.  Niche Media was sold in 2014.

Publications
 Las Vegas Sun
 VEGAS INC Vegas' business newspaper
 Las Vegas Weekly an alternative weekly newspaper
 Las Vegas Magazine a tourist guide; prior to 2006, known as Showbiz Weekly
 Vegas2Go

Former publications
 The Home News Community Newspapers of Nevada
 Boulder City News 89005
 Green Valley Home News 89014, 89074
 Henderson Home News 89002, 89011 and 89015
 Silverado Home News 89123, 89183; canceled in 2009
 South Valley Home News 89012, 89052, 89044
 Summerlin Home News (NE edition) 89128, 89129, & 89134; canceled in 2009
 Summerlin Home News (SW edition) 89117, 89135, 89138, 89144 & 89145; canceled in 2009
 West Valley News 89117, 89147; canceled in 2008
 Las Vegas Life, a monthly magazine

See also

 List of companies based in Nevada

References

External links
 , the group's official website
About Greenspun Broadcasting from KTUD-CA

Year of establishment missing 
Companies based in Henderson, Nevada
Magazine publishing companies of the United States
Mass media in Henderson, Nevada
Weekly newspaper companies of the United States
Greenspun family